Filippos Karvelas (1877 in Athens – 7 November 1952 in Athens) was a Greek gymnast. He competed at the 1896 Summer Olympics in Athens.

Karvelas competed in both the individual and team events of the parallel bars.  He did not win a medal in the individual event, though his ranking is unknown.  In the team event, Karvelas was a member of the Ethnikos Gymnastikos Syllogos team that placed third of the three teams in the event, giving him a bronze medal.

References

External links

1877 births
1952 deaths
Gymnasts at the 1896 Summer Olympics
19th-century sportsmen
Greek male artistic gymnasts
Olympic gymnasts of Greece
Olympic bronze medalists for Greece
Olympic medalists in gymnastics
Medalists at the 1896 Summer Olympics
Gymnasts from Athens
Date of birth missing
19th-century Greek people
20th-century Greek people